Chalakkara is a revenue village which forms a part of  Mahé municipality of Puducherry, India.Chalakara is a hilly area. The Mahe Institute of Dental Science is located in Chalakkara. The famous keezhanthoor temple is also in Chalakkara.

Rajiv Gandhi Ayurveda Medical College (a Government of Puducherry institution) and Mahatma Gandhi Government Arts College is in Chalakkara.

References

External Links

Mahatma Gandhi Government Arts College, Mahe - website
 Rajiv Gandhi Ayurveda College (a Government of Puducherry institution) - website
 Mahe Post Graduate Institute of Dental Sciences & Hospital - website

Villages in Mahe district